The City Hall of San Fernando, Pampanga, commonly referred to as Municipio de San Fernando, is a heritage building of the City of San Fernando, Pampanga province, Philippines.

History
The first municipal hall was built in the present site in 1755 out of stone and thatch. It was burned by the Philippine Revolutionary Army on the orders of Gen. Antonio Luna, on May 4, 1899. The building was reconstructed in 1917, during the term of the municipal president Antonio Abad Santos and under the supervision of the district engineer EJ Halsema (March 12, 1882 – March 15, 1945), replacing the 1874 building burned by Luna. Again burned during the Japanese invasion of the town, the municipal government was temporarily transferred to the residence of Vivencio Cuyugan in Barrio Del Pilar. After the war, the present City Hall of San Fernando was reconstructed using the original adobe stonework.

The pre-war history of San Fernando can be retraced starting from the Spanish era and short-lived revolutionary government period to the American government period. On July 17, 1754, Don Josef Bersosa, on behalf of the Augustinian cura parrocos of Bacolor and Mexico, presented a petition to Governor-General Pedro Manuel de Arandia for the creation of a new pueblo from the aid towns. In his petition, Bersosa said that the towns had grown so much in size that the former had 1,300 taxpayers while the latter had 1,600 taxpayers. As a result of this, the said priests could barely attend to the spiritual needs of such a great number of parishioners. This was also due to the great distance between the churches of Bacolor and Mexico which was three leagues away from each other through a street lined by a continuous row of houses leading from one church to the other.

The Capsule-marker was laid on January 3, 2000 at the entrance of the Municipio. San Fernando became the 99th City of the Republic of the Philippines on February 4, 2001 by virtue of Republic Act 8990. The City of San Fernando prides itself as the home of numerous personages in Philippine history, among whom include socialist leader and assemblyman Pedro Abad Santos, war hero and former chief justice Jose Abad Santos, revolutionary heroine Nicolasa P. Dayrit, poet and legislator Zoilo S. Hilario, senator and father of the concrete pavement Sotero J. Baluyut, revolutionary governor Tiburcio T. Hilario, and celebrated prewar journalist Amando G. Dayrit.

The Municipio was restored in 2003 by Mayor Rey B. Aquino.

Image gallery

References

Buildings and structures in San Fernando, Pampanga
San Fernando City Hall
Landmarks in the Philippines